Echford Lee Cooper Jr. (possibly April 13, 1925 – possibly August 1966), known as Lee Cooper, was an American blues guitarist.  Because of his relatively short career and the anonymous role of session musicians in the 1950s, Cooper is said to be "overlooked and highly underrated."

Probably born in Lexington, Mississippi, where he grew up, he started performing on the electric guitar in Chicago in the 1940s.  According to musician Eddie Boyd, with whom he later performed, Cooper was a chemistry graduate who lost an eye when acid splashed into it.  By the early 1950s, Cooper regularly performed with Kansas City Red, and on sessions at Chess Records on recordings by Big Bill Broonzy, Washboard Sam, and others.  Writer Cub Koda said that his aggressive licks anticipated those of Chuck Berry by several years.

In the mid 1950s, he succeeded Willie Johnson as the regular guitarist in Howlin' Wolf's band, and appeared on many of Wolf's most successful recordings, before being in turn replaced by Hubert Sumlin.   He also played on sessions by Jimmy Witherspoon, Big Walter Horton and others,  and in Eddie Boyd's band.  Boyd said of Cooper: "He was the best guitar I ever played with... just as good.. as any guitar player I ever heard.... [He] could play, he could go from John Lee Hooker to Charlie Parker... He was that kind of musician.  He knew how to pick anything."  Boyd also said that Cooper was dependent on alcohol.

Cooper is believed to have died in Chicago in 1966.

Discography

With Howlin' Wolf
More Real Folk Blues (Chess, 1953-56 [1967])

References

1920s births
1966 deaths
African-American guitarists
American blues guitarists
American male guitarists
Blues musicians from Mississippi
Chicago blues musicians
Year of birth uncertain
20th-century American guitarists
Guitarists from Illinois
Guitarists from Mississippi
People from Lexington, Mississippi
20th-century American male musicians
20th-century African-American musicians